Edmund Favor Noel (March 4, 1856 – July 30, 1927) was an American attorney and politician who served as governor of Mississippi from 1908 to 1912. The son of an early planter family in Mississippi, he became a member of the Democratic Party.

Noel was elected to the state house, as a district attorney, and to the state senate before winning an election as governor in 1907. As governor, he achieved gains in public education, child labor laws, and established a state charity hospital. After his tenure, he was re-elected to the state senate.

Early life, family and education
Edmund Favor Noel was born in 1856 on his family's cotton plantation in Holmes County, Mississippi near the city of Lexington, the third son of several children of Leland Noel and his wife, Margaret Ann Sanders. Noel's father had become a successful cotton planter before the war. His mother was a daughter of a Virginia planter. The earliest Noel ancestor in America immigrated to the Virginia Colony in the 1660s from the Netherlands, where his French Huguenot (Protestant) ancestor had migrated because of religious persecution in France. Edmund was named after his paternal uncle, Edmund Faver Noel, and in some records, his name appears with the same spelling.

His father, Leland Noel, had traveled with his brother Edmund to Mississippi in 1835, sent by their father as young unmarried men from their home plantation Paynefield in Essex County, Virginia. They were to develop a 1200-acre property their father had bought in Franklin. The brothers later purchased plantation properties in Holmes County, and Leland married a Southern woman. Together with a younger third brother, William L. Noel, who joined them, the three became major planters and enslavers in the area. According to the 1860 Slave Schedules of the U.S. Census, the three enslaved 130 people that year; Leland enslaved the most. They cultivated extensive cotton plantations in Holmes County.

Edmund's father, Leland, lost great wealth due to the Civil War, including his property in enslaved people. Rather than attending law school after college, his son Edmund Noel worked and 'read the law' with an established firm; when he was prepared, he passed the bar. He joined the Democratic Party.

Political career
When Noel entered politics, he was elected first to the Mississippi House of Representatives and later as a district attorney. In 1890 the Democratic-dominated legislature passed a new constitution with provisions that disenfranchised most African Americans by raising barriers to voter registration. White Democrats maintained this exclusion of blacks from politics through much of the 1960s in the state. These actions crippled the Republican Party in the state, whose members had been primarily made up of newly enfranchised African-American freedmen after the Civil War.

In 1895 Noel was elected to the Mississippi State Senate. He served in the U.S. Army in the Spanish–American War (1898). He was re-elected to the state senate in 1899.

While in the State Senate, Noel authored Mississippi's primary election law, designed to exclude blacks from the Democratic Party primary. In 1902, Mississippi passed this law, which defined political parties as private organizations outside the authority of the 15th Amendment.

The Mississippi Democratic Party excluded black citizens from membership and participation in its primaries. The "white primary," a device soon imitated in laws passed in most other Southern states, "effectively prevented the small number of blacks registered to vote from having any say in who got elected to partisan offices--from the local sheriff to the governor and members of Congress." Noel also promoted a state constitutional amendment providing for an elected judiciary.

In 1903 Noel tried to gain the party nomination for governor of Mississippi but was unsuccessful. By then, the disenfranchisement of blacks had resulted in a one-party Democratic state; the only competitive races in the state were the Democratic Party primaries; whoever won the primary was sure to win the general election.

In 1907, Noel won the Democratic primary and was elected Governor of Mississippi. He achieved numerous progressive reforms, including in education. These reforms included consolidation of the state's rural school districts, the establishment of agricultural high schools for whites, and the founding of a teacher's college in Hattiesburg (restricted to white students). Noel's administration also gained passage of laws regulating child labor, establishing statewide prohibition of alcohol, founding of a state charity hospital, and establishing pure food laws.

The business community in Jackson had recommended that both the 66-year-old Governor's Mansion and the Old Capitol be demolished and the sites redeveloped for commercial use. Noel and his wife Alice worked together to promote the preservation and renovation of the mansion. Through their efforts, it received its first major renovation and was updated for continued use.

After the end of his term, Noel continued to be active in state politics. In 1918, he was unsuccessful in his run for the United States Senate, which was newly based on popular voting. Since the adoption of the 17th Amendment in 1913, U.S. senators were elected for the first time that year by popular vote rather than by state legislatures. Noel ranked third; both he and Pat Harrison lost to the incumbent, populist U.S. Senator James K. Vardaman. Blacks were still effectively disenfranchised and excluded from voting.

In 1920, Noel was elected again to the Mississippi State Senate, serving until he died in 1927.

Personal life and death
Noel married Loula Hoskins in 1890. They had children together, including sons, before her death.

He married again in 1905 to a young widow, Alice Josephine (Tye) Neilson (1868-1933). She brought her two young sons, Halbert and Edwin, to the marriage. She served as First Lady when Noel was governor. She aided him in working to preserve and renovate the Governor's Mansion.

After his death in July 1927, Noel was buried at Odd Fellows Cemetery in Lexington, Mississippi. His wife, Alice Noel, was buried there after her death in 1933.

References

Further reading
"Holmes County, Mississippi/ Largest Slaveholders from 1860 Slave Census Schedules", Transcribed by Tom Blake, 2003, Rootsweb/Ancestry.com
"Race and Voting in the Segregated South", Constitutional Rights Foundation, 2015

1856 births
1927 deaths
Democratic Party governors of Mississippi
Democratic Party members of the Mississippi House of Representatives
Democratic Party Mississippi state senators
People of the Spanish–American War
Baptists from Mississippi
People from Lexington, Mississippi
Military personnel from Mississippi
19th-century Baptists